Communications on Pure and Applied Mathematics is a monthly peer-reviewed scientific journal which is published by John Wiley & Sons on behalf of the Courant Institute of Mathematical Sciences. It covers research originating from or solicited by the institute, typically in the fields of applied mathematics, mathematical analysis, or mathematical physics. The journal was established in 1948 as the Communications on Applied Mathematics, obtaining its current title the next year. According to the Journal Citation Reports, the journal has a 2020 impact factor of 3.219.

References

External links 
 

Mathematics journals
Monthly journals
Wiley (publisher) academic journals
Publications established in 1948
English-language journals